Arpenik Nalbandyan (December 23, 1916 – May 17, 1964) was a Soviet-Armenian artist.

Biography
Arpenik Nalbandyan was born on 23 December 1916 in Tbilisi. From 1935 to 1941 she studied painting at the Tbilisi State Academy of Arts, Georgia. Nalbandyan became a member of the Armenian Artists Union in 1943. In 1946 she started to teach at the Yerevan Institution of Fine Arts and Theater. In 1948 and 1952 she was elected as deputy of City Council. In 1956 she was awarded the "Honored worker" medal, and 1957 she was appointed to teach in Moscow. In 1961 she became Honorary Artist of the Armenian SSR.

Arpenik Nalbandyan died on 17 May 1964 in Yerevan.

Exhibitions
She participated in exhibitions in her home republic and in other parts of the USSR.
 1942 "The Red Army heroism", Yerevan
 1943 Reporting exhibition, Artist's house, Yerevan (solo exhibition)
 1948 38 works, Artist's house, Yerevan (solo exhibition)
 1967 Artist's house, Yerevan (solo exhibition)
 1988 Portrait exhibition, Yerevan
 2001 Albert and Tove gallery, YSA of Fine Arts (solo exhibition)
 2016 Solo exhibition on the 100th anniversary of Arpenik Nalbandyan at the National Gallery of Armenia

Family
 Brother - Dmitry Nalbandyan, people's painter of the USSR, an actual member of The Academy of Fine Arts of the USSR.
 Husband - Eduard Isabekyan, people's painter of Armenia, professor. They married in 1940.
 Sons:
 Mher Isabekyan - painter
 Aram Isabekyan - painter, rector of the Yerevan State Academy of Fine Arts, professor

Works
She has composed in the field of easel paintings. The works are prominent for their acute observation and delicate lyricism.
Her paintings (around 300) can be found at the National Gallery of Armenia (around 45), the Georgian National Gallery, the Gyumri Gallery, and in private collections.

Portraits
 "Self Portrait", 1942
 "The girl" - 1957
 "Mery Kochar's portrait", 1960, ANG
 "Mom Ovsanna", 1962
 "H. Hovhannisyan", 1963

Household paintings
 "In meditations", 1939
 "At the source", 1957
 "The gammer from Voskevaz", 1958

Landscape paintings
 "Akhtala", 1943
 "Autumn landscape", 1953
 "Khndzoresk", 1962

Medals and awards
 "Honored worker" medal, 1956
 The People's Painter of Armenia, 1961.

References

External sources
 Arpenik Nalbandyan
 Artists, Arpenik Nalbandyan
 Le Musée des Arts de l՚Arménie (Composition et introduction de N. Mazmanian) – Leningrad, Aurore, 1975, p. 94
 Armenian women artists 2000 – Armenian Culture Foundation (calendar)
 Arpenik Nalbandyan 100 (Author Hasmik Badalyan) – catalogue, Yerevan, 2016

1916 births
1964 deaths
Armenian artists
Painters from Georgia (country)
Artists from Tbilisi
Georgian people of Armenian descent
Soviet artists
20th-century Armenian painters
20th-century Armenian women artists